West Englewood is an unincorporated community located within Teaneck in Bergen County, New Jersey, United States.

Notable people

People who were born in, residents of, or otherwise closely associated with West Englewood include:
 Thomas Ryan Byrne (1923–2014), career diplomat who served as United States Ambassador to the Kingdom of Norway.
 Frank Chapman (1864–1945), ornithologist.

References

Teaneck, New Jersey
Unincorporated communities in Bergen County, New Jersey
Unincorporated communities in New Jersey